Aleksandar Kerčov (born 29 November 1940 in Belgrade) is a Yugoslav sprint canoer who competed in the early to mid-1960s. Competing in two Summer Olympics, he earned his best finish of eighth in the K-4 1000 m at Tokyo in 1964.

References
Sports-reference.com profile

1940 births
Canoeists at the 1960 Summer Olympics
Canoeists at the 1964 Summer Olympics
Living people
Olympic canoeists of Yugoslavia
Yugoslav male canoeists
Serbian male canoeists
Sportspeople from Belgrade